Ayhan is a Turkish masculine name and a family name.
Ayhan means the moon king .

Given name
 Ayhan Akman (born 1977), Turkish footballer
 Ayhan Aydan (1924–2009) Turkish opera singer
 Ayhan Gezen (born 1972), Turkish-German footballer
 Ayhan Karakuş (born 1989), Turkish wrestler
 Ayhan Kartal (1966–2000), Turkish rapist and child killer

Surname
 Burcu Ayhan (born 1990), Turkish female high jumper
 Devran Ayhan (born 1978), Turkish footballer
 Kaan Ayhan, Turkish footballer
 Pınar Ayhan, Turkish singer
 Sally Ayhan, weekend presenter for The Weather Channel
 Süreyya Ayhan (born 1978), Turkish female middle-distance runner
 Yalçın Ayhan (born 1982), Turkish footballer

Turkish unisex given names
Turkish-language surnames